Cobbe is an Irish surname, and may refer to:

Cobbe family, a prominent Irish family
Alexander Cobbe, Irish General and holder of VC 
Frances Power Cobbe, Irish writer and animal rights activist
Charles Cobbe, Archbishop of Dublin
John Cobbe, Irish born New Zealand politician 
Cobbe portrait, believed to be the only existing painting of William Shakespeare, in possession of the Cobbe family at the Newbridge Estate.

See also
Cobb (surname)
Cobbs
Dowle